Diamyd Medical AB (Stockholm NASDAQ, First North) is a small biotechnology company headquartered in Stockholm, Sweden that focuses on immune modifying therapies for diabetes. The company is developing two products. The first, called Diamyd, is an injection of recombinant human GAD65 protein combined with alum, meant to induce immune tolerance in those at high risk of developing type 1 diabetes. The second, Remygen, is a controlled-release form of GABA, intended to stimulate beta cell growth and reverse diabetes. Diamyd is the subject of a Phase III clinical trial; Remygen is the subject of a combined Phase I/II clinical trial.

The company is headquartered in Stockholm, and maintains a manufacturing facility in Umeå.

External links
 Diamyd Medical AB

References

Pharmaceutical companies of Sweden